Championship Bull Riding, Inc. (CBR) was a professional bull riding organization that was based in Weatherford, Texas, United States.

History
Stock contractor Terry Williams and Texas businessman Joel Logan founded Championship Bull Riding (CBR) in 2002. ProRodeo Hall of Fame cowboy and four-time world champion bull rider Tuff Hedeman was an integral part of the live event production and an ambassador for the organization from 2011 to 2018 after serving as president from 2005 to 2011. In early 2018, Hedeman left CBR to start his own organization: the Tuff Hedeman Bull Riding Tour.

From 2002 to 2007, CBR was televised on the Outdoor Channel, in 2008 on RFD-TV, from 2009 to 2011 on Great American Country, and from 2012 to 2017 was broadcast on Fox Sports Networks.

The CBR World Finals event was held in different locations of the United States throughout the years. From 2002 to 2005, it was held in Jackson, Mississippi, from 2006 to 2008 in Las Vegas, Nevada, from 2009 to 2010 in Kansas City, Missouri, in 2011 in Loveland, Colorado, and from 2012 to 2018 in Cheyenne, Wyoming at Cheyenne Frontier Days, held in conjunction with the annual Professional Rodeo Cowboys Association (PRCA) rodeo there.

In 2009, Cinch Jeans became the title sponsor of the CBR tour, thus becoming the Cinch CBR Tour.

In 2010, CBR introduced the Horizon Series, a division of lower-level events that allowed riders to work their up to the elite,  televised Cinch CBR Tour. That same year, the CBR Bull Team Challenge was launched. In these events, teams of stock contractors competed against each other at CBR events with a certain number of bulls per team by showcasing them with riders for large payout purses and accumulated points towards the year-end Bull Team Challenge championship. The Bull Team Challenge was originally held by the Professional Bull Riders (PBR) in 2008. However, it was discontinued by said organization after that one year, before being picked up by CBR in 2010.

From 2010 to 2018, CBR awarded its annual world champion a $100,000 bonus, and from 2013 to 2017, the winning rider of the world finals event average was awarded $50,000.

In 2013, the Cinch CBR Tour was renamed the Road to Cheyenne Tour. 

For its 2016-17 season, CBR’s Road to Cheyenne Tour and its subsidiary Horizon Series visited over 70 venues across the United States.

From 2013 to 2018, CBR's televised Road to Cheyenne Tour was conducted in the proprietary "8 Second Challenge" format. 24 riders would compete in the first round, and those who made a successful 8 second ride got paid $500. The top 12 riders based on scores returned to the second round, and those who made a successful 8 second ride got paid $750. The top 4 riders in the second round would move on to the third and final round and each rider, regardless if they made a successful 8 second ride or not, got paid $1,000. If the event leader rode his bull in the championship round and ended up scoring the most points, he received up to a $20,000 bonus. However, in the middle of the 2018 season, due to many requests from contestants, CBR's Road to Cheyenne Tour returned to a previous competition format where 35 riders would compete in a regular season event for a purse of $30,000. All 35 riders would compete in the long round and the top 15 based on scores would compete in the championship round. The winner of the event would get paid a minimum of $10,000. When the regular season ended, the top 35 riders in the world standings (combining Road to Cheyenne Tour and Horizon Series points) would qualify for the CBR World Finals. The rider who won the most points throughout the whole season was crowned the CBR World Champion.

The 2018 Road to Cheyenne Tour regular-season events were not televised and CBR went out of business after its 2018 World Finals. The World Finals itself was produced by the PBR and live-streamed on their subscription-based video-on-demand service, RidePass. 

After CBR’s collapse, the CBR Bull Team Challenge was renamed the Million Dollar Bull Team Challenge and became re-affiliated with the PBR. Its events now take place within PBR tour stops.

CBR World Champions
2018  Cody Jesus
2017  Sage Kimzey
2016  Sage Kimzey
2015  Cody Teel 
2014  Sage Kimzey 
2013  Cole Echols
2012  Josh Barentine
2011  Clayton Foltyn
2010  Luke Kelley
2009  Hugo Pedrero
2008  Clayton Baethge
2007  Bonner Bolton
2006  Matt Austin
2005  Matt Austin 
2004  Austin Meier 
2003  Ross Johnson
2002  Mike White

Horizon Series Champions
2018  Braden Richardson
2017  John Pitts 
2016  Koby Radley 
2015  Cody Rostockyj
2014  Kritter Lamb
2013  Tyler Adrian
2012  Josh Barentine
2011  Cody White
2010  Luke Kelley

Bull of the Year
2018 - Dirty Little Secret
2017 - Hy Test
2016 - Cowtown Cartel
2015 - Gold Buckle (tie)
2015 - Corpus Red (tie)
2014 - Penny Lover
2013 - Got It
2012 - Bugle
2011 - Double Scoop
2010 - Double Scoop
2009 - Texas Cocktail
2008 - Cochise
2007 - Zorro
2006 - Biloxi Blues

Bull Team Challenge Champions 

2018 - Jerilyn Harmon's Elite Bulls 

2017 - Williams / Freeman / Pepper

2016 - Harris Bucking Bulls

2015 - Rawson / Probst  

2014 - Cude Energy

2013 - B&M Bucking Bulls

2012 - The Jaynes Gang / Exclusive Genetics / Team Bays

2011 - The Washburn Company

2010 - Scott Burrus / Wild Card Rodeo Co.

Source:

See also
 Lists of rodeo performers
 Bull Riding Hall of Fame
 Professional Bull Riders
 Professional Rodeo Cowboys Association
 ProRodeo Hall of Fame
 American Bucking Bull
 International Professional Rodeo Association
 Women's Professional Rodeo Association
 Canadian Professional Rodeo Association
 Professional Roughstock Series
 Bull Riders Only

References

External links
 Championship Bull Riding
 Professional Rodeo Cowboys Association
 International Professional Rodeo Association
 Cheyenne Frontier Days

Organizations based in Fort Worth, Texas
Rodeo organizations
Organizations established in 2002